A utility clamp is a laboratory apparatus resembling a pair of scissors. The screw in the middle works as the wide adjustment of 2-prong. It is composed of 3 parts: 2-prong adjust, metal rod, and clamp down (the clamp is attached to the ring stand for adjusting the height). This apparatus is connected to a ring stand or retort stand. It is used to hold round laboratory glassware, such as beakers, and flasks, etc. This type of clamp is made from stainless steel.

References

Laboratory equipment